The San Diego State Aztecs women's volleyball team represents San Diego State University in women's collegiate volleyball. The Aztecs compete in the Mountain West Conference (MW) in Division I of the National Collegiate Athletic Association (NCAA). They play their home games on Aztec Court at Peterson Gymnasium, an on-campus facility.

Postseason

Head coaches

See also
 Aztec Hall of Fame

References

External links 
 

 
Mountain West Conference volleyball